The women's 200 metre butterfly event at the 2014 Commonwealth Games as part of the swimming programme took place on 28 July at the Tollcross International Swimming Centre in Glasgow, Scotland.

The medals were presented by Takitoa Taumoepeau, Secretary General of the Tonga Sports Association and National Olympic Committee and the quaichs were presented by Annette Knott, Secretary General of the Trinidad and Tobago Olympic Committee.

Records
Prior to this competition, the existing world and Commonwealth Games records were as follows.

Results

Heats

Finals

References

External links

Women's 200 metre butterfly
Commonwealth Games
2014 in women's swimming